Suq al layl may refer to several places in Saudi Arabia:

Suq al layl, Jizan
 Suq Al Lail -Mecca